Astral is a 2018 British horror film directed by Chris Mul and starring Frank Dillane and Vanessa Grasse.  It is Mul's feature directorial debut.

Cast
 Frank Dillane as Alex Harmann
 Louis Ahmet as Young Alex
 Vanessa Grasse as Alyssa Hodge
 Trevor White as Professor Gareth Powell
 Mark Aiken as  Dr James Lefler
 Juliet Howland as Michelle Collins
 Damson Idris as Jordan Knight
 Ned Porteous as Ben Lawrence
 Jennifer Brooke as Karina Richardson
 Darwin Shaw as Joel Harmann
 Catherine Steadman as Claire Harmann

Release
The film was released in theaters and VOD on November 23, 2018.

Reception
Jake Dee of JoBlo.com gave the film a 6 out of 10.  Norman Gidney of Film Threat awarded the film five stars out of ten.

Dennis Harvey of Variety gave the film a negative review and wrote, "You’ll wish you could project yourself into a different entertainment dimension while slogging through Astral."

References

External links
 
 

British horror films
2018 horror films
Vertical Entertainment films
2010s English-language films
2010s British films